Dijlah University College is a general university in Iraq. The university was founded in Baghdad according to decree No. 3322, issued by the Ministry of Higher Education and Scientific Research on 27 October 2004 in accordance with the law establishing private colleges and universities No. 13 of 1996.

Departments
 Department of Computer Techniques Engineering 
 Department of Refrigeration and Air conditioning Techniques Engineering
 Department of Building and Construction Engineering
 Department of Computer Sciences
 Department of Optics Techniques
 Department of Media
 Department of Analysis
 Department of Business Administration
 Department of Arabic Language
 Department of Law
 Department of Dentistry
 Department of Finance and Banking

See also
 List of universities in Iraq

External links
http://www.duc.edu.iq/

Universities in Iraq
Education in Baghdad
Educational institutions established in 2004
2004 establishments in Iraq